Club Deportivo Básico Alcobendas Rugby is a Spanish rugby team based in Alcobendas, Spain.

History
The club was established in 2003 by local fans from Alcobendas, and played its first ever season in División de Honor that year, occupying the place formally occupied by Moraleja.
Other past teams from Alcobendas includes Teca Rugby Club (1972–1990), Club España Urogallos (1979–1990), Alcobendas Rugby Club (1990–1999), Club de Rugby La Moraleja–El Soto (1990–1999), Moraleja Alcobendas Rugby Unión (1999–2003), Club Alcobendas Rugby (2003– ).

Trophies
División de Honor B: 2
Champions: 2006–07, 2009–10

Season by season

13 seasons in División de Honor

Notable players 
 Oriol Ripol
 Martin Kafka
 Jaime Nava
 Andrew Ebbet
 Yonadab Díez
 "Tiki"
 "Chupao"
 Simon Brooke
 Steve Tuineau
 Mariano Berges

Ground

Las Terrazas

Polideportivo José Caballero
In certain occasions, depending on the state of Las Terrazas' pitch or on the match, Alcobendas played at the rugby field of Polideportivo José Caballero in Alcobendas, in the section 17 of Nacional I. Said playing field was inaugurated by the Maori All Blacks in 1990 during a match against Spain. 
As of currently, the sports complex is used by the third grade team and the club's lower grade teams.

References

External links
Official site

Spanish rugby union teams
Rugby clubs established in 2003
Sport in Alcobendas
Sports teams in the Community of Madrid